Gennaro Basile was an Italian painter, born in Naples but active in the German-speaking countries. He settled at Brünn, in Moravia, and lived about 1756. His best picture is the altar-piece in the chapel of the chateau at Seeberg, in Salzburg. Most of his works remained in Moravia.

References

Year of birth unknown
Year of death unknown
18th-century Italian painters
Italian male painters
Italian Baroque painters
18th-century Italian male artists